Alex Breckenridge (born 17 April 1932 in Buffalo) is a former American marathon runner.

At the 1960 Summer Olympics he finished 30th, and at the 1962 Boston Marathon he finished third.

References

 Profile at the ARRS
 Profile at trackfield.brinkster.net
 

Living people
1932 births
American male marathon runners
Athletes (track and field) at the 1959 Pan American Games
Athletes (track and field) at the 1960 Summer Olympics
Olympic track and field athletes of the United States
Track and field athletes from Buffalo, New York
Pan American Games track and field athletes for the United States
20th-century American people